Brushton, also known as Costa, is an unincorporated community in Boone County, West Virginia, United States. Brushton has a post office with ZIP code 25051; the post office uses the name Costa.

References

Unincorporated communities in Boone County, West Virginia
Unincorporated communities in West Virginia